The 2013 Omaha mayoral election took place on May 14, 2013. Incumbent Mayor Jim Suttle sought a second term in office.

The position of mayor in Omaha is officially a non-partisan position. A blanket primary was held on April 2, 2013. The top two finishers in the primary, Suttle and City Councilwoman Jean Stothert, moved on to the general election. In the general election, Stothert defeated Suttle and became Omaha's first female mayor.

Primary election

Candidates
 Brad Ashford, State Senator (Voter registration: Independent)
 Maura DeLuca, factory worker and 2012 vice presidential nominee of the Socialist Workers Party (Voter registration: Socialist Workers)
 Dave Nabity, businessman (Voter registration: Republican)
 Jean Stothert, City Councilwoman (Voter registration: Republican)
 Mort Sullivan, perennial candidate
 Jim Suttle, incumbent Mayor (Voter registration: Democratic)
 Dan Welch, former City Councilman (Voter registration: Republican)

Results

General election

Candidates
 Jean Stothert, City Councilwoman
 Jim Suttle, incumbent Mayor

Results

References

Omaha
Mayoral elections in Omaha, Nebraska
2013 Nebraska elections